Kashmeeram is a 1994 Indian Malayalam-language action film directed by Rajiv Anchal, written by A. K. Sajan and produced by Menaka under Revathy Kalamandhir. Starring Suresh Gopi, Sharada, Priya Raman, Lalu Alex and Ratheesh. It was dubbed and released in Telugu as New Delhi.

Plot
The film starts in New Delhi, where NSG Captain Shyam (Suresh Gopi), leader of the Black Cat Commando Team, arrests a wanted terrorist named Jagmohan Pandey for murdering a police constable. Usha Varma (Sharada), a judge of the Supreme Court and the older sister of Home Secretary Rajagopal "Rajan" Varma (Lalu Alex), has intentions in handing down a sentence on Pandey for his crimes. In retaliation to Pandey's arrest and trial, Usha's son Unnikrishnan "Unni" Varma (Krishna Kumar) ends up being murdered in a bomb blast.

Following this incident, the government enlists Z Category protection details for Usha and her family while keeping the truth about Unni's death confidential from them. The Police Deputy Inspector General Balram (Ratheesh) gives the assignment to Shyam and the Black Cat Commando Team. However, Usha's family, especially her daughter Manasi Varma (Priya Raman), is distrustful and rude towards Shyam due to his brusque manner and tough attitude; and as a result, he ends up being humiliated and scoffed at. The only person who seems to understand and respect him is Rajan (as he was already informed of Unni's death by Shyam); even Usha's housekeeper Mariya Singh (Sukumari) warms up to Shyam when he confessed the truth about what happened to Unni.

When Shyam and his commando team inadvertently kill Manasi's boyfriend Nathuram (Madhupal) for trying to trespass into Usha's house, this intensifies Manasi's anger towards Shyam, with Usha dismissing him and his team from duty with intentions to put them on trial for Nathuram's death. However, this backfires horribly as Manasi (without any protection details) ends being kidnapped by a terrorist group led by Abbas Qureshi (Tej Sapru), who is Pandey's close friend and Nathuram's father. It eventually turns out that both Pandey and Nathuram are members of the terrorist group as Abbas planned the bomb blast that murdered Unni in response to Pandey's arrest, and that he sent Nathuram to trespass into Usha's house in an attempt to murder Usha. While beating up Manasi out of rage over Nathuram's death, Abbas spitefully confesses to her about Nathurum's true occupation and that he is responsible for Unni's death, much to Manasi's complete distress.

Abbas then makes a call to Usha, informing that he has kidnapped Manasi while issuing an ultimatum: Usha must drop all charges against Pandey and set him free, otherwise Abbas himself will murder Manasi. Around the same time, Rajan and Balram confessed to Usha and the rest of the family about Unni's death and Nathuram's true occupation. Shattered by these horrible revelations, Usha apologizes to Shyam and agrees to accept his protection details until she reads the verdict in Pandey's case at the Supreme Court. Rajan, Shyam and Balram then formulate a plan for action: Usha will release Pandey and have him sent back to the terrorist group, and during the exchange, Shyam will pose himself as Pandey to fool Abbas and the terrorists in releasing Manasi.

Though the plan for the exchange was a success, Pandey escapes and informs Abbas and the terrorists about the 'switch', causing a battle between the Black Cat Commando Team and the terrorist group. The commandos are able to wipe out many of the terrorists to their deaths while Shyam rescues Manasi and has her taken away to safety. However, Pandey murders Balram while attempting to aid Abbas, provoking an angry Shyam to kill both Abbas and Pandey in revenge for Balram and Unni's deaths.

With the terrorists defeated, Manasi is reunited with her family, who finally show respect towards Shyam, who gets promoted to becoming the new security-in-chief for the governor of Kashmir. Before Shyam and the Black Cat Commando Team leave on their next assignment, a grateful Manasi apologizes to Shyam for her rude behavior towards him.

Cast
Suresh Gopi as Captain Shyam Mohan Varma, an NSG Officer
Sharada as Usha S. Varma, Judge of the Supreme Court
Priya Raman as Manasi Varma, Usha's daughter
Lalu Alex as Rajagopal "Rajan" Varma IAS, Central Home Secretary to India
Ratheesh as DIG Balram IPS
Sukumari as Mariya Singh, Usha's housekeeper
Suchitra as Mithra R. Varma, Rajan's daughter
Krishna Kumar as Unnikrishnan "Unni" Varma, Usha's son
Tej Sapru as Abbas Qureshi, an infamous terrorist leader
Madhupal as Nathuram Qureshi, Abbas' son and a wanted terrorist posing as a photographer
Bobby Kottarakkara as Kuttan Chatterji, Usha's chef
Nandhu as Sanjay, drama school student and a terrorist ally

Soundtrack

References

External links
 

1990s Malayalam-language films
1994 films
Films about terrorism in India
Indian Army in films
Fictional portrayals of the Delhi Police
Films shot in Delhi
Films scored by M. G. Radhakrishnan
Films directed by Rajiv Anchal